Gooik–Geraardsbergen–Gooik was an elite women's professional one-day road bicycle race held between Gooik and Geraardsbergen in Belgium and was rated by the UCI as a 1.1 race.

Past winners

References

External links 
 Pro Cycling Stats.com

Cycle races in Belgium
Women's road bicycle races
Gooik-Geraardsbergen-Gooik
2011 establishments in Belgium
Recurring sporting events established in 2011
2019 disestablishments in Belgium
Recurring sporting events disestablished in 2019